Ben Anthony "Honey Buns" Cavil (born January 31, 1972) is a former American football guard who played two seasons for the Baltimore Ravens of the National Football League (NFL). In addition to Baltimore, Cavil spent time with the San Diego Chargers, Philadelphia Eagles, Cleveland Browns, Scottish Claymores and New York/New Jersey Hitmen.

Early life and education
Ben Cavil was born on January 31, 1972, in Galveston, Texas. He attended high school at La Marque (TX). Cavil then went to college and played football for the Oklahoma Sooners. He lettered from 1991 to 1994 before being signed by the San Diego Chargers.

Professional career

San Diego Chargers
Cavil went undrafted in the 1995 NFL Draft and was then signed as an undrafted free agent by the San Diego Chargers. He dislocated his wrist in training camp and was subsequently placed on injured reserve, ending his season. He did not make the roster in his second season.

Philadelphia Eagles
After being released by San Diego, Cavil was signed by the Philadelphia Eagles. He would be released at roster cuts but later signed to the practice squad, were he stayed all season. He was traded to the Baltimore Ravens in exchange for a 7th round draft pick the next year.

Baltimore Ravens
After being traded, Cavil was able to make the roster of Baltimore. He would then make an appearance in 15 out of 16 games, missing only the final week. He started 8 of those games. He had 4 penalties in the season. The next year Cavil came back and appeared in all 16 games, but only starting 6. Cavil was nicknamed "Honey Buns" by Ravens teammates. He would leave the Ravens the next year after being drafted in the 1999 NFL Expansion Draft.

Cleveland Browns
Cavil was then selected in the 1999 NFL Expansion Draft by the Cleveland Browns. He was released at roster cuts.

Scottish Claymores
In 2000, Cavil played for the Scottish Claymores of NFL Europe.

New York/New Jersey Hitmen
His final season was in 2001 with the New York/New Jersey Hitmen of the XFL.

Personal life
After his professional career Cavil worked in real estate. He also enjoyed collecting comic books.

References

1972 births
Living people
Oklahoma Sooners football players
Baltimore Ravens players
Scottish Claymores players
New York/New Jersey Hitmen players
American football offensive guards